Jacob Dalsgaard Bymar (born 29 March 1982) is a Danish footballer currently playing for B68. He is a former Danish youth international.

References

External links
Jacob Bymar at DBU

1982 births
Living people
People from Fanø Municipality
Danish men's footballers
B68 Toftir players
KÍ Klaksvík players
Association football forwards
Sportspeople from the Region of Southern Denmark